The African Men's Olympic Qualifiers was held to determine the African national teams for under 23 that will participate at the 2008 Summer Olympics football tournament held in Beijing.

Preliminary competition will be divided in three rounds. First two rounds will be knock-out rounds, and the final round will be a group stage.

First round
First leg played on September 1 to September 3, 2006. Second leg played on October 6 to October 8, 2006.

|}
 Only one leg because of security concerns in Somalia.
 Only one leg because of security concerns in Djibouti.

Second round
First leg played on February 7 and February 8, 2007. Second leg played on March 23 to March 25, 2007.

|}
 Burkina Faso penalized by FIFA for allegedly using two overage players during first leg match against Ghana. The original score was Burkina Faso won by 2–0.
 DR Congo failed to appear, and blamed poor flight connections. FIFA handed walkover to Senegal.

Final round
Matches played from June 1, 2007 to March 26, 2008. The winner of each group will represent Africa at the 2008 Olympic Games.

Group A
Ethiopia has withdrawn from the Olympic qualification after the first match due to millennium festivities in their country.

Group B

Group C

Match abandoned at 80, when six Botswanan players were sent off forcing the referee to call off the game.

References

External links
Men's African Qualifiers for 2008 Summer Olympics - Rsssf.com

CAF
Oly
Oly
Football at the Summer Olympics – Men's African Qualifiers